The Kaiming dynasty was a dynasty of the Ancient Kingdom of Shu in Chinese history, founded in 666 BC by , who came from the State of Chu. The Kaiming dynasty lasted twelve generations until the Qin conquest. Legend has it that Bieling had died in Chu and his body floated upriver to Shu, whereupon he came back to life. While at Shu, he was successful in managing a flood and Duyu then abdicated in his favor. A later account states that the Kaiming kings occupied the far south of Shu before travelling up the Min River and taking over the throne from Duyu.

See also 

 Shu
 Chengdu

References 

History of Sichuan
Shu (state)
Former countries in Chinese history